2015 LFF I Lyga was a Lithuanian second-tier football league season which started on March 28, 2015 and finished on October 31. It consisted of 18 teams.

Clubs (2015)

2015 I Lyga Table

See also 
2015 A Lyga

References 

2015
2
Lith
Lith